The fifth season of the American television series Parenthood premiered on September 26, 2013 and concluded on April 17, 2014.  It consisted of 22 episodes.

Cast

Main cast 
 Peter Krause as Adam Braverman
 Lauren Graham as Sarah Braverman
 Dax Shepard as Crosby Braverman
 Monica Potter as Kristina Braverman
 Erika Christensen as Julia Braverman-Graham
 Sam Jaeger as Joel Graham (21 episodes)
 Savannah Paige Rae as Sydney Graham (19 episodes)
 Xolo Maridueña as Victor Graham (19 episodes)
 Max Burkholder as Max Braverman (21 episodes)
 Joy Bryant as Jasmine Trussell (21 episodes)
 Tyree Brown as Jabbar Trussell (19 episodes)
 Miles Heizer as Drew Holt (18 episodes)
 Mae Whitman as Amber Holt (20 episodes)
 Bonnie Bedelia as Camille Braverman (17 episodes)
 Craig T. Nelson as Zeek Braverman (21 episodes)

Recurring cast 
 Mia Allan and Ella Allan as Nora Braverman
 Ray Romano as Hank Rizzoli
 Tyson Ritter as Oliver Rome
 Matt Lauria as Ryan York
 David Denman as Ed Brooks
 Jurnee Smollett-Bell as Heather Hall
 Sonya Walger as Meredith Peet
 Kelly Wolf as Mrs. McKindall
 Tina Lifford as Renee Trussell
 Lyndon Smith as Natalie
 Courtney Grosbeck as Ruby Rizzoli
 Nick Krause as Chad "Berto" Roberto
 Jonathan Tucker as Bob Little
 Skyler Day as Amy Ellis
 Tom Amandes as Dr. Pelikan
 Matthew Atkinson as Zach
 Josh Stamberg as Carl Fletcher
 Alexandra Barreto as Karen Fillman
 Zachary Knighton as Evan Knight
 Rose Abdoo as Gwen Chambers
 David L. King as Principal Radford

Special guest stars 
 Sarah Ramos as Haddie Braverman
 David Walton as Will Freeman (of About a Boy) in episode 13 "Jump Ball"

Episodes

Ratings

U.S. Live Ratings

References 

2013 American television seasons
2014 American television seasons
Parenthood (2010 TV series)